Partenza is Buono!'s first major label EP. It was released by their new label Zetima on August 10, 2011, a week after its 30-second promotional video. The first press edition included a photo card. It reached #21 on Oricon's weekly chart, a new low for the band.

CD track listing 
 "partenza~Let's Go!!!~"
 "Zassou no Uta"
 "FrankincenseΨ"
 "My Alright Sky"
 "Natsu Dakara"
 "Kia Ora Gracias Arigato"
 "Juicy He@rt"
 "1/3 no Junjou na Kanjou" (Siam Shade cover)

External links 
 Buono! official blog 
 Official Hello! Project profile 

Buono! albums
2011 EPs
Zetima EPs
J-pop EPs